Denis Kenzo (born 10 May 1989) is a Russian DJ and music producer, who is well known in the trance music scene. He was a former member of musical duo Two&One. Since 2016, he is the label owner of Denis Kenzo Recordings. Kenzo was born in Khabarovsk, Russia.

Career 
At the beginning of his career, Kenzo's work is characterized by the release of singles with little-known performers. During that period, he attempted to become a producer who would produce electronic music exclusively.

From 2012 to 2013, Kenzo worked together with Mikhail Gasyak as musical duet Two & One, releasing progressive trance songs.

From 2014 to present, he worked as a solo artist, producing vocal trance under the Denis Kenzo pseudonym. Some compositions were recorded with the participation of his wife Svetlana Pisareva (Sveta B.). His popular tracks were released on Sir Adrian Music label, which he worked on for 4 years. "Lullaby Lonely" was included in the "State Of Trance 2013" compilation, "Ashes" was included in the A State of Tranсe 2015 compilation, and several tracks were also included in the Vocal Trance Hits - The Best of 2016 compilation. The unofficial clip for his "Run Away" song is currently the Denis' highest viewed video with a one million views.

In the summer of 2016, he launched his own Denis Kenzo Recordings label.

On January 31, 2017, the Denis Kenzo Recordings label was picked up by Armada Music until 2019.

On July 1, 2022, he released his first album, entree.

On November 11, 2022, he released album with Whiteout, titled 'Intelligency'.

Discography

Singles

Remixes

References

1989 births
Russian DJs
Russian trance musicians
Russian record producers
Remixers
Club DJs
People from Khabarovsk
Living people
Electronic dance music DJs